Heteroponera mayri is a species of ant in the genus Heteroponera. Endemic to Brazil and Paraguay, it was described by Kempf in 1962.

References

External links

Heteroponerinae
Hymenoptera of South America
Insects described in 1962